The Grosses Wannenhorn is a 3906-metre mountain in the Bernese Alps, in the Swiss canton of Valais near the village of Fiesch. It is part of the Walliser Fiescherhörner. The mountain separates the Aletsch Glacier to the west from the Fiescher Glacier to the east.

The Grosses Wannenhorn is rocky, while its southern counterpart, the Kleines Wannenhorn, is somewhat flatter. The mountain's east side is heavily glaciated, while the west side is a steep slope intermittently broken by ice fields.

The mountain was first climbed by Gottlieb Studer and team in 1864.

See also

List of mountains of the Alps above 3000 m
List of mountains of Switzerland

References

External links
The Grosses Wannenhorn on Hikr

Mountains of the Alps
Alpine three-thousanders
Mountains of Switzerland
Bernese Alps
Mountains of Valais
Three-thousanders of Switzerland